Gemstones is the third solo album by American musician Adam Green. It was released on January 10, 2005 in Europe and on February 22, 2005 in the United States. The album is characterised by the heavy presence of Wurlitzer piano, whereas its predecessor relied on a string section in its instrumentation.

Track listing

Personnel
Adam Green – voice, guitar
Steven Mertens – bass
Parker Kindred – drums
Nathan Brown – electric piano (Wurlitzer), organ
Chis Isom – guitar
Greg Calbi – mastering
Dan Myers – mixing, recording

References

2005 albums
Adam Green (musician) albums
Rough Trade Records albums